Bulawayo Central is a constituency in the National Assembly of the Parliament of Zimbabwe. It covers the central areas of Bulawayo. It is currently represented by Nicola Watson of the Movement for Democratic Change Alliance.

Members

Election results

References 

Parliamentary constituencies in Zimbabwe
Bulawayo